Mehmet Topuz (born 7 September 1983) is a Turkish former professional footballer who played as a midfielder or right-back for Kayserispor and Fenerbahçe.

Club career
Topuz had begun his career in Yolspor, a local club located in Kayseri. He joined Kayserispor in 2000. He has been given several Golden Man of the Month awards which are presented monthly and supported by Turkey Heart Foundation. His performance at Süper Lig attracted the major clubs of Turkey. However, Kayserispor Board strongly asserted that they would not let him go and supported their intentions to keep him in the club by advertising on billboards. Afterwards, he extended his contract with the club, eventually becoming the team captain.

He was linked with Spanish side Valencia in May 2008. He played total of six games for Kayserispor in European competitions and scored two goals during their UEFA Intertoto Cup campaign in the 2006 season, in which they became the first team from Turkey to win the competition. Kayserispor qualified for the UEFA Cup and lost 4–3 on aggregate against AZ in the second round. In 2007–08 season, he played two games in UEFA Cup qualification, in which Kayserispor lost against Paris Saint-Germain 2–1 on aggregate.

After playing five years for Kayserispor, he became one of the finest Turkish talents during his time and eventually moved to Turkish giants Fenerbahçe in 2009 for a fee of €9 million + Gökhan Emreciksin following a lengthy transfer battle with fellow rival giants Beşiktaş in which he wore the Beşiktaş jersey after agreeing terms with the club. However the transfer failed when Fenerbahçe secured the deal by arranging an agreement with his club Kayserispor, making him one of the most expensive internal Turkish transfers.

Topuz scored his first goal against Twente in the first group game of UEFA Europa League from a freekick at 71st minute. Although this game tied the score, Twente scored another goal six minutes later, and sealed a 2–1 win in Istanbul.

International career
Topuz played 22 times for Turkey U21 national team and scored 2 goals. He represented the senior national team 18 times.

Career statistics

International

Honors
Kayserispor
UEFA Intertoto Cup: 2006
Türkiye Kupası: 2007–08

Fenerbahçe
Süper Lig: 2010–11, 2013–14
Türkiye Kupası: 2011–12, 2012–13
Süper Kupa: 2009, 2014

References

External links

 
 

1983 births
Kayserispor footballers
Fenerbahçe S.K. footballers
Living people
Turkish footballers
Turkey international footballers
Süper Lig players
Turkey under-21 international footballers
Association football midfielders
TFF First League players
People from Yozgat Province